Syros Island National Airport  is an airport serving Syros Island in Greece. It is also known as Syros National Airport "Demetrius Vikelas", named for Demetrius Vikelas (1835–1908), a Greek businessman and writer born in Ermoupoli on the island of Syros.
The airport was opened in 1991.

Facilities

Airlines and destinations
The following airlines operate regular scheduled and charter flights at Syros Island Airport:

Statistics

See also
Transport in Greece

References

External links
 
 

Airports in Greece
Buildings and structures in Syros